Ectopoglossus confusus, the confusing rocket frog, is a species of frog in the family Dendrobatidae. It is endemic to Rio Junin, Imbabura Province, Ecuador on the western slopes of the Andes mountains and can be found in rocky streams in lower montane rainforest and has a severely declining population from copper mining in the region. Its range includes the Reserva Ecológica Los Ilinizas, but no conservation specific to the species can be found there. There have been efforts to protect the Confusing Rocket Frog and other species of the region from mining, and movements to urge the government of Ecuador to stop allowing mining to occur.

References

Poison dart frogs
Amphibians of Ecuador
Endemic fauna of Ecuador
Taxonomy articles created by Polbot
Amphibians described in 2009